Gary Thomas "Dizzy" Disley is a former professional rugby league footballer who played in the 1980s and 1990s. He played at representative level for Great Britain (Under-21s) and England, and at club level for Salford City Reds, as a prop, i.e. number 10.

Playing career
Disley joined his hometown club Salford in June 1983. He spent 7 years at the club, appearing in 92 games.

International honours
Disley won 4 caps for England as a substitute.

References

1966 births
Living people
England national rugby league team players
English rugby league players
Leigh Miners Rangers players
Rugby league players from Salford
Rugby league props
Rugby league second-rows
Salford Red Devils players